Biduk-e Murtak (also Romanized as Bīdūk-e Mūrtak; also known as Bīdūk) is a village in Eskelabad Rural District, Nukabad District, Khash County, Sistan and Baluchestan Province, Iran. At the 2006 census, its population was 19, in 5 families.

References 

Populated places in Khash County